The Aircraft Research XBT-11 was to have been a basic trainer constructed by the Aircraft Research Corporation (formerly the Vidal Research Corporation) of Bendix, New Jersey, by molding "Weldwood", a "plastic" plywood composite material made of heat and pressure-processed phenol phenol-formaldehyde resins and wood similar to the Duramold process. The Duramold and Haskelite processes were first developed in 1937, followed by Eugene L. Vidal's Weldwood in 1938. A production contract, proposed in 1940, was cancelled before any were built.

Specifications

See also
Timm PT-160 A wood composite trainer.

References

External links
 https://web.archive.org/web/20100411065456/http://personal.psu.edu/users/d/o/dob104/aviation/us/btrainer.html

BT-11
Cancelled military aircraft projects of the United States
Single-engined tractor aircraft